Campylosiphon is a genus of flowering plants in the Burmanniaceae, first described as a genus in 1882. It is native to tropical western and central Africa, as well as northern South America.

 Species
 Campylosiphon congestus (C.H.Wright) Maas - Liberia, Ghana, Nigeria, Cameroon, Gabon, Central African Republic, Zaire, Angola  
 Campylosiphon purpurascens Benth. - Brazil, Colombia, Venezuela, Guyana, Suriname, French Guiana

References

Burmanniaceae
Dioscoreales genera
Parasitic plants